Tatobotys is a genus of moths of the family Crambidae described by Arthur Gardiner Butler in 1881.

Species
Tatobotys africana (Ghesquière, 1942)
Tatobotys albivenalis Hampson, 1897
Tatobotys angustalis Caradja & Meyrick, 1933
Tatobotys aurantialis Hampson, 1897
Tatobotys biannulalis Walker, 1866
Tatobotys depalpalis Strand, 1919
Tatobotys janapalis (Walker, 1859)
Tatobotys tanyscia West, 1931
Tatobotys varanesalis (Walker, 1859)
Tatobotys vibrata Meyrick, 1929

Former species
Tatobotys amoyalis Caradja, 1932
Tatobotys picrogramma (Meyrick, 1886)

References

Spilomelinae
Crambidae genera
Taxa named by Arthur Gardiner Butler